Antun Dunković (born 7 June 1981) is a Croatian retired footballer who played as a defensive midfielder. He last played for NK Opatija in the Croatian Third Football League.

He previously played for NK Pomorac, NK Rijeka, NK Slaven Belupo, NK Croatia Sesvete and Belgian sides KV Mechelen and Royal Antwerp FC.

Honours
NK Pomorac
Druga HNL: 2000-01

HNK Rijeka
Croatian Cup: 2005

NK Opatija
Treća HNL - West: 2013-14
Inter-county League Rijeka promotion: 2014-15

References
K.V. Mechelen bio
Guardian Football

1981 births
Living people
Sportspeople from Virovitica
Association football midfielders
Croatian footballers
HNK Suhopolje players
NK Pomorac 1921 players
HNK Rijeka players
NK Slaven Belupo players
NK Croatia Sesvete players
K.V. Mechelen players
Royal Antwerp F.C. players
NK Crikvenica players
NK Opatija players
FK Partizani Tirana players
Croatian Football League players
Belgian Pro League players
Challenger Pro League players
First Football League (Croatia) players
Kategoria Superiore players
Croatian expatriate footballers
Expatriate footballers in Belgium
Croatian expatriate sportspeople in Belgium
Expatriate footballers in Albania
Croatian expatriate sportspeople in Albania